Nassir may refer to:
 Nassir Abojalas, Saudi Arabian basketball player
 Yusuph Nassir, Tanzanian politician